Bless a Brand New Angel is the sixth studio album from American singer Benny Mardones, released by Crave in 1998.

Background
Both Bless a Brand New Angel and its title track (which was released as a single) failed to generate commercial success. As "Bless a Brand New Angel" began generating airplay in the United States, Crave was shut down in July 1998. On June 19, 1998, the Gavin Report listed "Bless a Brand New Angel" under adult contemporary as "chartbound", with the single having generated 46 reports and 671 spins. In 1999, Bless a Brand New Angel was reissued as Angel by Fuel 2000. The title track achieved further airplay, with the Gavin Report reporting 87 spins and placing the song at No. 35 on their Adult Contemporary chart.

Critical reception

Tomas Mureika of AllMusic described Bless a Brand New Angel as "standard fare" from Mardones, but praised his vocals as "strong". He added: "While it lacks the punch of his 1980s material, Bless a Brand New Angel contains more soulful rockers in the tradition that Mardones has made solidly his own." In a review of the title track, Larry Flick of Billboard described it as "meticulously designed for AC playlists". He praised Mardones' "raspy voice" which he felt "makes for a nice contrast against the track's oh-so-pretty piano/string arrangement".

Track listing

Personnel
 Joel Diamond - producer (all tracks)
 Jim Ervin - producer (tracks 1 and 2, 4 to 10), executive producer
 Maurice Starr (track 3)

References

1998 albums
Benny Mardones albums
Crave Records albums
Albums produced by Maurice Starr